The canton of Trévières is an administrative division of the Calvados département, in northwestern France. Its chief town is Trévières. Its borders were modified at the French canton reorganisation which came into effect in March 2015

Composition

It consists of the following communes:

Asnières-en-Bessin
Aure sur Mer
Balleroy-sur-Drôme
La Bazoque 
Bernesq
Blay
Le Breuil-en-Bessin 
Bricqueville
Cahagnolles
La Cambe
Canchy
Cardonville
Cartigny-l'Épinay
Castillon
Colleville-sur-Mer
Colombières
Cormolain 
Cricqueville-en-Bessin
Crouay
Deux-Jumeaux
Englesqueville-la-Percée
Étréham
La Folie
Formigny La Bataille
Foulognes
Géfosse-Fontenay
Grandcamp-Maisy
Isigny-sur-Mer
Lison
Litteau
Longueville
Maisons 
Mandeville-en-Bessin
Le Molay-Littry 
Monfréville
Montfiquet 
Mosles
Noron-la-Poterie 
Osmanville
Planquery 
Rubercy
Sainte-Honorine-de-Ducy
Sainte-Marguerite-d'Elle
Saint-Germain-du-Pert
Saint-Laurent-sur-Mer
Saint-Marcouf
Saint-Martin-de-Blagny
Saint-Paul-du-Vernay 
Saint-Pierre-du-Mont
Sallen
Saon
Saonnet 
Surrain
Tour-en-Bessin
Tournières 
Trévières
Le Tronquay
Trungy 
Vierville-sur-Mer

Councillors

Following the death of Jean-Pierre Richard and the resignation of his substitute, Laurent Aubry, a by-election is held on June 12 and 19, 2016. In the second round, Patrick Thomines (LR) is elected with 62.96% of the votes cast.

Pictures of the canton

References

Trevieres